The Hound of the Baskervilles is a 1932 British mystery film directed by Gareth Gundrey and starring John Stuart, Robert Rendel and Frederick Lloyd. It is based on the 1902 novel The Hound of the Baskervilles by Arthur Conan Doyle, in which Sherlock Holmes is called in to investigate a suspicious death on Dartmoor. It was made by Gainsborough Pictures. The screenplay was written by Edgar Wallace.

Plot summary
Accordint to the rumour, a beastly howl is heard in the moors of Dartmoor, and a hellhound is killing every member of the Baskerville family. Sherlock Holmes and his assistant Dr. Watson go there to investigate the case, only to discover that behind this mystery there is a local farmer who is using a phosphorescent dog to kill the heirs in order to obtain the inheritance.

Cast
 John Stuart as Sir Henry Baskerville
 Robert Rendel as Sherlock Holmes
 Frederick Lloyd as Dr. Watson
 Heather Angel as Beryl Stapleton
 Reginald Bach as Stapleton
 Wilfred Shine as Dr. Mortimer
 Sam Livesey as Sir Hugo Baskerville
 Henry Hallett as Barrymore
 Sybil Jane as Mrs. Barrymore
 Elizabeth Vaughan as Mrs. Laura Lyons

Reception
Contemporary reviews found the film lacking. Bioscope claimed: "It is upon the dialogue of Edgar Wallace rather than sustained action that the producer relies to hold his audience, and the development becomes tedious in the attempt to piece together the various phases of the mystery." Picturegoer said: "This picture fails to do justice to Conan Doyle's thrilling Sherlock Holmes story."

Production
The first sound version of The Hound of the Baskervilles, it had a budget of £25,000.

On 28 February 1931 Lustleigh railway station, on the then-Great Western Railway, was used as the location for 'Baskerville' station at which Sherlock Holmes and Dr. Watson are seen arriving.

For many years, it was believed that only the (silent) picture negative of this movie still existed. However, in 1991, a complete set of negatives and soundtracks were donated to the British Film Institute (BFI) by the Rank Corporation. As such, the film now survives intact (and with sound) in the BFI archives.

References

External links
 |id= 53021}}
 
 

Films based on The Hound of the Baskervilles
1932 films
British mystery films
1930s mystery films
Films directed by Gareth Gundrey
Films with screenplays by Edgar Wallace
Sherlock Holmes films
British black-and-white films
Gainsborough Pictures films
1930s English-language films
1930s British films